Mae Costello (born Mae Altschuk; August 13, 1882 – August 2, 1929) was an American stage and film actress of the early twentieth-century.

Early life
Mae Costello was born Mae Altschuk in Brooklyn, New York to Catherine (née Callender) and Lewis Altschuk (born 1855), a Bavarian immigrant. As a teenager, she began performing in stage productions in stock theater companies throughout the United States.

In 1902, she married actor Maurice Costello. They had two daughters, Dolores Costello and Helene Costello, both of whom became successful film actresses. The couple separated in 1910 and divorced in 1927.

Career
Costello appeared in motion pictures beginning in the early 1910s, billed as Mrs. Costello, opposite such actors as John Bunny, Flora Finch, Wallace Reid, Florence Turner, Antonio Moreno, Bobby Connelly and Clara Kimball Young, as well as her husband and daughters.

In 1929, Costello died of heart disease and was interred at the Calvary Cemetery, East Los Angeles, California.

Partial filmography
The Money Mill - Mrs. King (1917)
Her Right to Live - Mrs. Biggs (1917)
When a Woman Loves - Mrs. King (1915)
The Taming of Betty - Mrs. Cutler (1913)
The Spirit of the Orient (1913)
The One Good Turn (1913)
The Mills of the Gods - The Nurse (1912)
Diamond Cut Diamond - The Telephone Operator (1912)
Her Crowning Glory - The Nurse (1911)

References

External links
 
 

1882 births
1929 deaths
American stage actresses
American film actresses
American people of German descent
American silent film actresses
Actresses from New York (state)
People from Brooklyn
Burials at Calvary Cemetery (Los Angeles)
19th-century American actresses
20th-century American actresses
Catholics from New York (state)